Judy Piatkus is a former British publisher, who founded her own company, Piatkus Books, in 1979.

Biography 
Piatkus founded Piatkus Books from the bedroom of her home in Loughton, Essex, in 1979. The publishing house published bestselling authors Nora Roberts, Danielle Steel and Virginia Andrews, among others, growing to become one of the most successful romance publishers in the UK and a pioneer in publishing books on personal development and lifestyle.

Known for its extensive list of genre fiction and non-fiction, Piatkus published a wide range of titles, from cookbooks by Mary Berry to fiction by Nora Roberts. Piatkus became known in the area of personal growth and lifestyle when it published mindfulness titles by Jon Kabat-Zinn, alongside business books such as David Allen's Getting Things Done. Piatkus explored a wide range of subjects such as feng shui, spirituality, alternative health, the mind-body connection, detoxing, and other topics that were relatively unfamiliar in the UK at that time. Many leaders in their fields of expertise such as Seth Godin and Dr Irvin Yalom were on the Piatkus list. As a publisher, Judy Piatkus was regarded as a risk-taker within the publishing industry, described as "never afraid to take a chance on an unknown whose work she believed in."

In 2007, Piatkus completed a successful exit sale to Little, Brown, who have continued to publish books under the Piatkus imprint.

Piatkus continued her interest in leadership and entrepreneurship working as a coach and mentor to start-ups and SMEs. During her years as a publisher Piatkus achieved a diploma in psychodynamic psychotherapy and counselling and worked in the NHS in the evening after work.  In 2016 she went to university for the first time as a mature student and was awarded an MA degree in Creative Leadership. In 2011, Piatkus founded the global non-profit organisation ConsciousCafe which connects people around the world with regular local groups and events that focus on conscious conversations, raising self-awareness and exploring new ideas and current issues.

In April 2021, Judy published her first book, Ahead of her Time, a memoir and story of female entrepreneurship, values-led management, and the rise of personal development publishing.

Recognition 
In December 2005, Piatkus was awarded the Women in Publishing Pandora Award. In February 2009 she received a lifetime achievement award from the Romantic Novelists' Association.

Ahead of Her Time was the winner of a 2022 Business Book Award in the Business Journey category.  The judges described the book as ‘page turning’. It was also selected by Soul and Spirit magazine as the Most Empowering Book of 2021.

References 

British publishers (people)
Year of birth missing (living people)
Living people